Arthur Leslie Noel Douglas Houghton, Baron Houghton of Sowerby,  (11 August 1898 – 2 May 1996) was a British Labour politician. He was the last British Cabinet minister born in the 19th century. After he retired in 1967, every Cabinet minister has been born since 1900. He was also the last veteran of World War I to serve in the Cabinet and both Houses of Parliament.

Early life
Houghton was born in Long Eaton, Derbyshire and later secured a post in the civil service. He then fought in the First World War, surviving the Battle of Passchendaele.

Political career
Houghton was a great believer in equality of opportunity and campaigned for certain numbers of lower (clerical) grade civil servants to have the chance of taking an examination that could lead to previously unheard-of promotion . In 1922, he founded the Inland Revenue Staff Federation and was its leader from 1922 to 1960. He served on the General Council of the Trades Union Congress from 1952 to 1960, and as Chairman of the Staff Side Civil Service National Whitley Council from 1955 to 1957.

He was a panel member of a BBC radio programme Can I help You? between 1941 and 1964. His connections with the London Labour movement and the Labour Party gave him the profile to become an Alderman of the London County Council - the forerunner of the Greater London Council - from 1947–1949.

After John Belcher quit the House of Commons over accusations of minor dishonesty, Houghton was persuaded to seek nomination for the subsequent by-election. He secured this and on 16 March 1949 was elected to Parliament for the Yorkshire constituency of Sowerby with a majority of 2,152.

He was re-elected in the subsequent general elections of 1950, 1951, 1955, 1959, 1964, 1966 and 1970. His head for figures and tenacity made him a good candidate for Chairman of the Public Accounts Committee in the House of Commons, succeeding Harold Wilson in this post after Wilson was elected Leader of the Labour Party in 1963. When, after 13 years in government, the Conservative Party was defeated in October 1964, Houghton became a cabinet minister in Wilson's first government and was appointed a Privy Counsellor.

The post of Chancellor of the Duchy of Lancaster after 1964 gave Houghton a position in the cabinet and special responsibility for Social Services but not an actual department over which he could preside. This made it hard to be particularly effective as a minister, and in a 1966 reshuffle, Wilson made him Minister without Portfolio.

Houghton became a Companion of Honour on 5 January 1967 and was dropped from government in 1967 and became Chairman of the Parliamentary Labour Party (PLP) which is a post designed to help shape and reflect the backbench Labour MPs' views but keep them in dialogue with the Labour leadership. His predecessor, Emanuel Shinwell, could be rather fiery and unpredictable. By contrast, Houghton had a tenacity and command of detail that made him a highly suitable person for the task, given there was perceived to be quite a lot of factionalism in the party at the time. He retired from the House of Commons at the February 1974 General Election and was elevated to the House of Lords as Baron Houghton of Sowerby, of Sowerby in the County of West Yorkshire a few months later on 20 June.

Lord Houghton was passionate about the subject of animal welfare and spoke in the House of Lords on the subject a number of times. Shortly before he died in 1996, he was the last member of the House of Lords to have fought in the First World War, and at 97, was then its oldest serving member. A warm tribute was paid to him by Tam Dalyell, himself a former MP, in one of Britain's national newspapers.

The Labour History Archive and Study Centre at the People's History Museum in Manchester holds the collection of Douglas Houghton, whose papers include those of the Parliamentary Labour Party, animal charities and pressure groups, as well as broadcasts, speeches and correspondence.

Personal life
In 1939, he married Vera Houghton who also worked at Association of Officers for Taxes, before becoming a campaigner for abortion law reform and free birth control.

Arms

References

External links 
 

1898 births
1996 deaths
British Army personnel of World War I
General secretaries of the Inland Revenue Staff Federation
King's Royal Rifle Corps soldiers
Labour Party (UK) MPs for English constituencies
Houghton of Sowerby, Douglas Houghton, Baron
London Regiment soldiers
Members of London County Council
Members of the Fabian Society
Members of the General Council of the Trades Union Congress
Members of the Order of the Companions of Honour
Members of the Privy Council of the United Kingdom
Ministers in the Wilson governments, 1964–1970
People from Long Eaton
UK MPs 1945–1950
UK MPs 1950–1951
UK MPs 1951–1955
UK MPs 1955–1959
UK MPs 1959–1964
UK MPs 1964–1966
UK MPs 1966–1970
UK MPs 1970–1974
Military personnel from Derbyshire
UK MPs who were granted peerages
Chancellors of the Duchy of Lancaster
Life peers created by Elizabeth II